is a railway station in Ōji, Nara, Japan. Operated by West Japan Railway Company (JR-West) and Kintetsu Railway, it is one of the four oldest railway stations in Nara Prefecture, and forms a major junction in the region. The station serves the Yamatoji Line (Kansai Main Line), and is the terminus for the Wakayama Line and Kintetsu Ikoma Line.

Kintetsu's station has a stationmaster who administrates between Motosanjoguchi Station and the station on the Ikoma Line and all stations on the Tawaramoto Line. The nearby  is also the terminus for Kintetsu Tawaramoto Line.

Station layout

JR-West platforms and tracks
The JR West station has one side platform and two island platforms, serving five tracks at ground level.

Kintetsu Railway platform and tracks 
The Kintetsu station consists of a bay platform serving two tracks at ground level.

Shin-Ōji Station

Platforms and track 
The station consists of two bay platforms serving a single track at ground level. The north platform is used for boarding and the south platform is used for alighting.

External links

 Official website (JR-West) 
 

 

Railway stations in Japan opened in 1890
Railway stations in Japan opened in 1922
Railway stations in Japan opened in 1918
Railway stations in Nara Prefecture